The 167th Airlift Wing (167 AW) is a unit of the West Virginia Air National Guard, stationed at Shepherd Field Air National Guard Base, Martinsburg, West Virginia. If activated to federal service, the Wing is gained by the United States Air Force Air Mobility Command.

Overview
The 167th Airlift Wing of the West Virginia Air National Guard is an airlift unit that flies the C-17 Globemaster III aircraft. The wing began at the end of World War II when its 167th Fighter Squadron flew the P-51 Mustang and F-86 Sabre fighters. The unit has deployed to the four corners of the Earth in support of the Global War on Terrorism and continues to support this effort. The 167th's focus today, and in the future, is summed up in the unit's motto: "Mountaineer Pride Worldwide."

The unit has been active in numerous exercises such as Sentry Storm, Volant Oak, Rodeos, and various overseas deployments; for example, 1981, and again in 1988, all aircraft deployed to Europe a first for any unit.

Units
The 167th Airlift Wing is composed of the following units:
 167th Operations Group
 : 167th Airlift Squadron

 167th Maintenance Group
 167th Mission Support Group
 167th Medical Group

History
The 167th Tactical Airlift Group, was established on 1 July 1972 when authorization was granted to expand the 167th Tactical Airlift Squadron to group level.  The 167th TAG was operationally gained by Tactical Airlift Command and flew C-130A Hercules transports . Late in 1977, the unit received "B" model C-130s. The 1986, the number of aircraft assigned increased, and in 1989, the "B" model was replaced with the "E" model.

Initially, the base at the Eastern West Virginia Regional Airport had only one hangar, a motor pool, and a supply building. Many major additions have since been made to the base, including a fire hall, base operations building, nose dock, civil engineering building, corrosion control/fuel cell facility, engine shop, aerospace ground equipment shop, barracks, clinic, avionics shop and aerial port building.

On Sunday, 8 July 1984, the 167th Tactical Airlift Group reached 100,000 hours of safe flying, only the fifth Air Guard unit to achieve this goal. In 1987, the unit received an Operational Readiness Inspection (ORI) from the Military Airlift Command. The unit received eight Outstanding, twelve Excellent and one Satisfactory rating among the various components of the unit. Other awards during this period include the fourth Air Force Outstanding Unit Award received in 1988 and the Distinguished Unit Flying Award from the National Guard Association in 1989.

The conversion in July 1989 to the newer C-130E broadened the group's capabilities with the ability to airdrop during adverse weather and transport an additional 20,000 pounds of cargo.

In 1990, the unit came to the aid of communities, providing relief efforts for victims of Hurricane Hugo and the California earthquake. Supplies were also flown to Puerto Rico, which had been devastated by the hurricane. Also in 1990, members of the Aeromedical Evacuation Flight, Mobile Aerial Port Squadron, Tactical Airlift Squadron and Consolidated Aircraft Maintenance Squadron, along with support personnel from other areas were the first called to volunteer to take part in Operation Desert Shield.  They did so, with many leaving on only a few hours' notice.

Reorganization and realignment put the 167th in the Air Combat Command during this time frame. Another first for the 167th was the receipt of a new C-130H-3 on 21 December 1994. Greeted by Santa Claus upon its arrival, the aircraft is the first new plane received by the unit in its history. Previous conversions had been to newer models, but not just off the assembly line.

In early 1995, while flying the C-130E version of the C-130 Hercules aircraft, the by now renamed 167th Airlift Group (167 AG) began conversion training for the C-130H-3 variant in the first quarter, transferring most of their "E" models to the Illinois Air National Guard's 182d Airlift Wing in Peoria, Illinois. The 167 AG's Civil Engineers deployed to Panama and the Medical Squadron deployed to Honduras that year, while most of the sections took part in a deployment to Alpena, Michigan, in September where chemical exercises and other special training took place. The unit celebrated its 40th anniversary on 10 June 1995.

In 1995, the unit began conversion training for the C-130H-3 in the first quarter and transferred most of the "E" models to Peoria, Illinois. The Civil Engineers deployed to Panama and the Medical Squadron deployed to Honduras. Most of the sections took part in a deployment to Alpena, Michigan in September where chemical exercises and other special training took place. The unit celebrated its 40th anniversary on 10 June 1995 with an open house and dance.

The 167th Airlift Group was redesignated the 167th Airlift Wing (167 AW) on 1 October 1995 and as it became operationally capable in the C-130H-3 aircraft to perform its airlift mission. Then on 16 April 1997, the 167th Airlift Wing was reallocated to the Air Mobility Command (AMC), with no change in mission or assignment. The 2005 Base Realignment and Closure Commission converted the wing's aircraft from the C-130 Hercules to the C-5 Galaxy. In February 2012, the Force Structure Overview was released by the Secretary of the Air Force. The document detailed numerous aircraft changes throughout the active, Guard and Reserve forces, including the replacement of the unit's C-5 aircraft with C-17s. On 25 September 2014, the 167th Airlift Wing flew its final C-5 mission, a local training sortie. That same day the wing received its first C-17 Globemaster III aircraft, one of eight C-17s the unit is slated to receive.

The Wing participated in an Operational Readiness Evaluation and Inspection in 1998 at the Combat Readiness Training Center, Savannah, Georgia. At the conclusion of the ORI, the 167th received its first ever overall Outstanding rating.
Since the 11 Sept. 2001, terrorist attacks on New York City and Washington, D.C., the unit has had members deployed to the four corners of the world in support of Operations ENDURING FREEDOM and IRAQI FREEDOM. Unit members have received six Bronze Stars and two Purple Hearts in support of these operations.

In March 2002, West Virginia Senator Robert Byrd announced that the unit would transition to the C-5 Galaxy aircraft. On 4 December 2006 the first C-5 aircraft assigned to the unit landed at Shepherd Field. Ten more aircraft were assigned to the 167th Airlift Wing throughout the following two years.

On 28 March 2007 the unit launched its first C-5 mission from Shepherd Air Field. After a brief stop at Dover Air Force Base, the aircraft continued on to Camp Lemonier, Djibouti, Africa, delivering two CH-53E Super Stallion helicopters (used for humanitarian assistance, personnel and equipment movement, and noncombatant casualty evacuations) and more than 60 marines supporting Combined Joint Task Force - Horn of Africa.

The wing has since retired its fleet of C-5 aircraft and has received eight C-17 Globemaster III transport aircraft.

Lineage
 Established as 167th Aeromedical Transport Group, 1 June 1961
 Redesignated 167th Tactical Airlift Group, 1 July 1972
 Re-designated: 167th Airlift Group, 1 June 1992
 Status changed from Group to Wing, 1 October 1995
 Re-designated: 167th Airlift Wing, 1 October 1995

Assignments
 118th Tactical Airlift Wing, 1 July 1972 – 1 October 1995
 Gained by: Tactical Air Command
 Gained by: Military Airlift Command, 1 December 1974
 Gained by: Air Mobility Command, 1 June 1992
 Gained by: Air Combat Command, 1 December 1993 – 1 October 1995
 West Virginia Air National Guard, 1 October 1995 – Present
 Gained by: Air Mobility Command

Components
 167th Operations Group, 1 October 1995 – Present
 167th Tactical Airlift (later Airlift) Squadron, 1 July 1972 – 1 October 1995

Stations
 Eastern WV Regional Airport, Martinsburg, West Virginia, 1 June 1961
 Designated: Shepherd Field Air National Guard Base, West Virginia, 1991-Present

Aircraft
 C-119 Flying Boxcar, 1961-63
 C-121 Constellation, 1963-71
 C-130 Hercules, 1971-2006
 C-5 Galaxy, 2006–2014
 C-17 Globemaster III, 2015–Present

References

External links
 Official Site for the 167th
 167th Airlift Wing
 Article detailing expansion of Shepherd Field to accommodate the C-5 Galaxy

Wings of the United States Air National Guard
Military units and formations in West Virginia
0167
West Virginia Air National Guard